Leena Salmenkylä (born 13 March 1958) is a Finnish orienteering competitor and world champion.

She won a gold medal in the relay event at the 1979 World Orienteering Championships in Tampere, with Leena Silvennoinen and Liisa Veijalainen on the Finnish relay team.

See also
 Finnish orienteers
 List of orienteers
 List of orienteering events

References

1958 births
Living people
Finnish orienteers
Female orienteers
Foot orienteers
World Orienteering Championships medalists